Malpica de Bergantiños (or simply Malpica) is a municipality of northwestern Spain in the province of A Coruña, in the autonomous community of Galicia. The church of Santiago de Mens stands in the town.

In front of Malpica are the Islas Sisargas, a small archipelago used as shelter by numerous marine birds.  Main sights include the Church of Santiago de Mens, in Romanesque style (12th century) and the dolmen of Pedra da Arca.

Demography 
From:INE Archiv

References

Municipalities in the Province of A Coruña